Girdler is an unincorporated community in Knox County, Kentucky, United States.

A post office was established in 1888 and named for the local Girdler family. This post office is still going today. Girdler Elementary is part of the Knox County school district. Girdler is home to a Dollar General store and multiple churches. Also Girdler has its own volunteer fire department.

References

Unincorporated communities in Knox County, Kentucky
Unincorporated communities in Kentucky